General elections were held in 1984. Following the elections, Robert Rex remained Premier and appointed Enetama Lipitoa, Frank Lui and Robert Rex Jr. to the cabinet.

References

Niue
Elections in Niue
1984 in Niue